The Taggart Lake Trail is a  long round-trip hiking trail in Grand Teton National Park in the U.S. state of Wyoming. The trail is accessed from the Taggart Lake trailhead and provides access to Taggart Lake, with views of the lake and the Teton Range. At Taggart Lake, the trail intercepts the Valley Trail which heads north towards Bradley Lake or south to Death Canyon.

See also
 List of hiking trails in Grand Teton National Park

References

Hiking trails of Grand Teton National Park